Ab Lashkar-e Sofla (also Romanized as Āb Lashkar-e Soflá; also known as Āb Lashgar-e Soflá and Āb Lashgar Soflá) is a village in Rud Zard Rural District, in the Central District of Bagh-e Malek County, Khuzestan Province, Iran. At the 2006 census, its population was 19, in 5 families.

References 

Populated places in Bagh-e Malek County